Jiyang may refer to:

 Jiyang District, Jinan, Shandong province, China
 Jiyang Subdistrict, seat of Jiyang County
 Jiyang District, Sanya, Sanya, Hainan province, China
 Jiyang Town, in Jiyang District